Nationality words link to articles with information on the nation's poetry or literature (for instance, Irish or France).

Events

Works published

United Kingdom
 John Armstrong, The Oeconomy of Love, published anonymously
 Isaac Hawkins Browne the elder, A Pipe of Tobacco, anonymously published, imitating Colly Cibber, Ambrose Philips, James Thomson, Edward Young, Alexander Pope and Jonathan Swift
 Mather Byles, To His Excellency Governor Belcher, on the Death of His lady. An Epistle. English Colonial America
 William Dawson, Poems on Several Occasions, anonymously published; influenced by the style of Alexander Pope; English, Colonial America
 Stephen Duck, Poems on Several Occasions
 William Melmoth the Younger, Two Episodes of Horace Imitated
 Alexander Pope
 Bounce to Fop: An heroick epistle from a dog at Twickenham to a dog at court
 The Works of Alexander Pope, Volumes 3: fables, translations and imitations; Volume 4 includes The Dunciad (see also Works 1717, 1735 and 1737)
 Elizabeth Rowe, The History of Joseph
 James Thomson, last two parts of Liberty (see also Antient and Modern Italy; Greece; Rome 1735):
 Britain, Part 4
 The Prospect, Part 5, the last part

Other
 Johann Jakob Bodmer, Brief-Wechsel von der Natur des poetischen Geschmackes ("Exchange of letters on the nature of poetic taste"), German-language, published in Switzerland, criticism

Births
Death years link to the corresponding "[year] in poetry" article:
 May 1 – Charles Jenner (died 1774), English poet, novelist and Anglican cleric
 May 8 –  Caterina Dolfin (died 1793), Venetian poet
 June 28 – Gottlieb Konrad Pfeffel (died 1809), German writer, military scientist, educator and poet
 July 1 – Annis Boudinot Stockton (died 1801), poet and sponsor of literary salons in Colonial New Jersey
 October 27 – James Macpherson (died 1796), Scottish poet
 Hedvig Löfwenskiöld  (died 1789), Swedish poet
 Johann Gottlieb Willamov (died 1777), German

Deaths
Birth year links to the corresponding "[year] in poetry" article:
 Kada no Azumamaro 荷田春満 (born 1669), Japanese early Edo period poet,  philologist and teacher as well as poetry tutor to one of the sons of Emperor Reigen; together with Keichū, co-founder of the kokugaku ("national studies") intellectual movement (surname: Kada)
 Thomas Yalden (born 1670), English poet and translator

See also

 Poetry
 List of years in poetry
 List of years in literature
 18th century in poetry
 18th century in literature
 Augustan poetry
 Scriblerus Club

Notes

 "A Timeline of English Poetry" Web page of the Representative Poetry Online Web site, University of Toronto

18th-century poetry
Poetry